Double Fuck is a mixtape make by French rapper Kaaris. It was released on 16 October 2015 by Therapy Music and Def Jam France.

Track list
"Sinaloa" (3:39)
"Terrain" (3:14)
"Démarrage Hold-up" (4:30)
"Petit vélo" (4:09)
"Briller" (4:10)
"C'est la base" (feat. XVBARBAR) (6:20)
"Talsadoum" (2:43)
"Tieks" (3:57)
"H" (4:13)
"Audemard m'a tué" (3:56)
"Gringo" (Bakyl) (3:43)
"Où sont les €" (feat. SCH & Worms-T) (5:03)
"Finition" (PSO Thug) (3:47)
"Recharge" (4:32)
"D.K" (4:28)
"Double Fuck" (2:58)

Charts

Weekly charts

Year-end charts

References

French-language albums
2015 mixtape albums